The 1964–65 Wichita State Shockers men's basketball team represented Wichita State University in the 1964–65 NCAA University Division men's basketball season. They played their home games at the University of Wichita Field House. They were in their 20th season as a member of the Missouri Valley Conference and 59th season overall. They were led by first-year head coach Gary Thompson. The Shockers finished the season 21–9, 11–3 in Missouri Valley play to finish in first place. They received a bid to the 1965 NCAA Tournament and advanced to the first Final Four in school history.

Roster

Schedule and results

|-
!colspan=12 style=""| Regular season

|-
!colspan=9 style="" | 1965 NCAA Tournament

Rankings

Awards and honors
Dave Stallworth – Consensus Second-team All-American

NBA Draft

References

Wichita State Shockers men's basketball seasons
Wichita State
Wichita State
NCAA Division I men's basketball tournament Final Four seasons
Shock
Shock